Safari Adventure is a 1966 children's book by the Canadian-born American author Willard Price featuring his "Adventure" series characters, Hal and Roger Hunt.

The plot concerns the epic problem of poachers, who are killing off the wildlife in Tsavo Game reserve. The game warden, Mark Crosby, is lost about what to do. Hal and Roger help the warden by capturing 47 of the poachers and sending them off to the Mombasa jail to be tried in court, but the warden's friend, Judge Singh, is giving the criminals little or no punishment because he is their leader.

1966 American novels
Novels by Willard Price
Novels set in Kenya
Jonathan Cape books
1966 children's books